2011–12 Eerste Klasse was a Dutch association football season of the Eerste Klasse.

Saturday champions were:
A: Ajax Amateurs
B: VV Smitshoek
C: SteDoCo
D: DTS Ede
E: HZVV

Sunday champions were:
A: HFC EDO
B: Quick Den Haag
C: RKVV Brabantia
D: RKSV Schijndel
E: VV De Bataven
F: VV Nieuw Buinen

Eerste Klasse seasons
5